The Independent Order of Odd Fellows (IOOF) Hall No. 148, also known as Fraternal Order of Eagles (FOE) Aerie No. 2059, is a meeting hall building in Carnation, Washington.  It was built in 1895.  listed on the National Register of Historic Places in 1999.

In 1985 the building was listed as a King County, Washington historic site. 

The building has a prominent gambrel roof which gives it a barn-like appearance.

Gallery

References

National Register of Historic Places in King County, Washington
Cultural infrastructure completed in 1895
Fraternal Order of Eagles buildings
Carnation
Buildings and structures in King County, Washington
Clubhouses on the National Register of Historic Places in Washington (state)